Idrac-Respaillès is a commune in the Gers department in southwestern France.

Geography
The Petite Baïse flows north through the middle of the commune, then forms its northeastern border.

Population

See also
Communes of the Gers department

References

Communes of Gers